Synoria antiquella is a species of snout moth. It is found in Greece and Turkey.

References

Moths described in 1855
Phycitini
Moths of Europe
Moths of Asia